Maple River is an unincorporated community in Carroll County, in the U.S. state of Iowa.

History
A post office was established as Maple River Junction in 1877, and renamed Maple River in 1883; the post office remained in operation until it was discontinued in 1968. The community took its name from a nearby stream lined with soft maple trees.

Maple River's population was 76 in 1902, and 108 in 1925.

References

Unincorporated communities in Carroll County, Iowa
1877 establishments in Iowa
Populated places established in 1877
Unincorporated communities in Iowa